David Honybun (born 3 April 1962) is a former Australian rules footballer who played with Carlton and Richmond in the Australian Football League (AFL).

Notes

External links 

David Honybun's profile on Blueseum

1962 births
Carlton Football Club players
Richmond Football Club players
Living people
Australian rules footballers from New South Wales
University Blues Football Club players
University Blacks Football Club players
People educated at Scotch College, Melbourne
New South Wales Australian rules football State of Origin players